Mark Charnock (born 28 August 1968) is an English actor, known for his role in ITV's Emmerdale as Marlon Dingle, a role he has played since 1996. Charnock and Emmerdale co-star Dominic Brunt, who plays Paddy Kirk, produce a yearly Zombie Film Festival in the Leeds Cottage Road Cinema.

Early life
Charnock was born on 28 August 1968, and was educated at Canon Slade School, Hull University and Webber Douglas Academy of Dramatic Art. With fellow Emmerdale co-star Dominic Brunt, he hosted Leeds' first ever zombie festival on 20 April 2008.

Career
Charnock's television debut was in 1992, when he played the character of Duane in an episode of 2point4 Children. In 1993, he appeared as a solicitor in the ITV comedy Watching, and later starred alongside Derek Jacobi in Cadfael (1994–1997). In 1993 and 1995, Charnock appeared in two episodes of the ITV soap opera Coronation Street. In 1996, he got the part of Marlon Dingle in Emmerdale. In 2004, he won the award for Best Male Dramatic Performance at the British Soap Awards.

Filmography

Awards and nominations

References

External links
 

1968 births
People from Bolton
English male soap opera actors
Living people
People educated at Canon Slade School